James Chan is the name of:

James Chan Soon Cheong (born 1926), Malaysian Catholic priest
James Chan Khay Syn (born 1950), mayor of Kuching South, Sarawak, Malaysia
James Byron Chan (born 1969), Papua New Guinea politician

See also
James Chan Leong (1929–2011), American artist
James Chen (disambiguation), various people
James Chin, American public health epidemiologist